The giant leptocephalus (Coloconger giganteus) is an eel in the family Colocongridae (worm eels/short-tail eels). It was described by Peter Henry John Castle in 1959. It is a marine, deep-water dwelling eel which is distributed worldwide.

References

Eels
Taxa named by Peter Henry John Castle
Fish described in 1959